María Ángeles Calderón González (born 27 October 1974 in Madrid) is a goalball player from Spain.  She is blind and is a type B2 goalball player. She works for ONCE selling coupons. She played goalball at the 2000 Summer Paralympics.  Her team was second.

References

External links 
 
 

1974 births
Living people
Paralympic goalball players of Spain
Paralympic silver medalists for Spain
Paralympic medalists in goalball
Visually impaired category Paralympic competitors
Goalball players at the 2000 Summer Paralympics
Medalists at the 2000 Summer Paralympics
Sportspeople from Madrid
Spanish blind people